Notre Dame College of Education may refer to:

Liverpool Hope University
 Notre Dame College of Education, formerly at Bearsden Academy
Notre Dame High School, Glasgow

See also
Collège Notre-Dame du Sacré-Cœur 
University of Notre Dame